Daniel José Sili (25 October 1930 – 8 February 2022) was a Brazilian water polo player. He competed in the men's tournament at the 1952 Summer Olympics.

References

External links
 

1930 births
2022 deaths
Brazilian male water polo players
Olympic water polo players of Brazil
Water polo players at the 1952 Summer Olympics
Place of birth missing